State Road 159 in the U. S. state of Indiana exists in three separate sections.

Route description

Southern section
The southern section begins at State Road 67 at Bicknell and ends at State Road 58 in Freelandville,  to the north.

Middle section
The middle section begins at Pleasantville and ends at State Road 54 at Dugger,  to the north.

Northern section
The northern section begins at State Road 48 at Shakamak State Park and ends at State Road 46 at Riley,  to the north.

Major intersections

References

External links

Indiana Highway Ends - SR 159

159
Transportation in Clay County, Indiana
Transportation in Knox County, Indiana
Transportation in Sullivan County, Indiana
Transportation in Vigo County, Indiana